The saddle shoe, also known as "saddle oxford", is a low-heeled casual shoe, characterized by a plain toe and saddle-shaped decorative panel placed mid foot. Saddle shoes are typically constructed of leather and are most frequently white with a black or dark blue saddle, although any color combination is possible.

Saddle shoes are worn by both men and women in a variety of styles ranging from golf cleats to school uniform shoes. They have a reputation as the typical shoes of school-girls, especially in the 1940s.

In popular culture

 In 1957 Elvis Presley wore saddle shoes in Jailhouse Rock.
 Bert from Sesame Street often wore saddle oxfords and they can be seen in his song and dance called "Doin' the Pigeon".
 The Peanuts comic strip character Lucy van Pelt wears saddle shoes.
 Character Audrey Horne in Twin Peaks is often seen wearing saddle shoes.
 In Family Matters, saddle shoes were part of Steve Urkel's distinctive, "nerdy" fashion sense
 Character Jelly Otter in PB&J Otter wears saddle shoes
 Character Rory Gilmore in Gilmore Girls wears saddle shoes as a part of her school uniform.
 Character Elaine Benes from Seinfeld wore them frequently.
 India Stoker, the protagonist of the 2013 film Stoker, receives a pair of saddle shoes every year on her birthday.

References

External links

Shoes
1950s fashion